Sergei Pavlovich Pavlov (Russian: Сергей Павлович Павлов) (19 January 1929 – 7 October 1993) was a Soviet youth leader, politician and diplomat.

Career 
Sergey Pavlov was born in Rzhev into a family of a peasant father and a noble mother. His maternal grandfather, Nikolai Timofeevich Vasiliev, graduated from the St. Petersburg Conservatory and worked as a conductor. Maternal grandmother Glafira Sergeevna Pylaeva came from a hereditary family of clergymen.
His paternal grandfather, Pyotr Pavlov was captured by the Germans during the 1914-1918 war, and learnt how to make confectionary while he was a prisoner of war. Sergei's father, Pavel Pavlov, was the choirmaster in Rzhev, and his mother was a pianist. Sergei and his mother were evacuated after the German invasion in 1941, while his father organised a choir on the front line. After his return, Sergei went to an agricultural college in Rzhev, and then the Moscow Institute of Physical Education, where he was appointed secretary of the Komsomol (Communist Youth League) committee. He worked as a full-time Komsomol official for seven years, and in 1959 was appointed the First Secretary of Komsomol, the youngest holder of that office in 25 years. In October 1961, he was made a member of the Central Committee of the Communist Party of the Soviet Union.

Pavlov was a protégé and ally of Alexander Shelepin, who was appointed head of Komsomol shortly before the death of Joseph Stalin, and was the head of the KGB at the time when Pavlov took over control of Komosomol. Unlike Shelepin, Pavlov was not involved in the coup that removed Nikita Khrushchev from power in 1964, because he was in Tokyo for the Olympic Games at the time, but he was part of the faction that opposed the relaxing of censorship and de-Stalinisation initiated by Khrushchev.

In March 1963, he published an article in Pravda, attacking the literary journal Novy Mir over its publication of the memoirs of Ilya Ehrenburg, a short story by the future Nobel prize winner Aleksandr Solzhenitsyn, and other items which Pavlov thought should have been suppressed. Speaking to foreign correspondents the following month, he attacked the poet Yevgeny Yevtushenko.

In August 1965, Pavlov was the first Soviet official post-Khrushchev who tried to halt and begin to reverse the criticism of Stalin's record, summed up as his 'cult of personality'. Writing in Pravda on 29 August 1965, Pavlov claimed:

In 1967-68, the party leader, Leonid Brezhnev carried out a purge of officials associated with Shelepin, including the head of the KGB, Vladimir Semichastny, who was sacked and replaced by Yuri Andropov. Pavlov was removed from the office in June 1968. Four members of the Komsomol central committee and 'countless' local officials were also sacked. The new 'youth' leader appointed in Pavlov's place was Yevgeny Tyazhelnikov, who was 40 years old and had not been involved in Komsomol for at least seven years.

Pavlov was a close friend of the first cosmonaut Yuri Gagarin (1934 - 1968), whose death he considered a political assassination.

In 1968–1983, Pavlov was the Chairman of the Committee for Physical Culture for Sport, or USSR 'Minister for Sport'. 

He headed the Soviet delegation at the Olympic Games 1968, 1972, 1976, 1980, ZOI 1972, 1976, 1980. Six times in a row, at three summer and three winter Olympics, USSR athletes won the team event. In the parade, the head of the delegations was the chairman of the USSR Sports Committee, Sergei Pavlov, who held this post for 15 years.

One of the most striking events of his tenure in this post was the Olympics-80 in Moscow, in which his organizational skills, authority and friendly ties in the sports world of the planet played a role, for example, with the Adi Dassler family (Adi Dassler, founder of Adidas) and his daughter Brigitte Benkler-Dassler, with the President of the NOC of Liechtenstein and member of the IOC Baron Eduard von Falz-Fein, the President of the NOC of Germany Willy Daume, the German businessman Berthold Beitz (Krupp Company), the President of the Mexican NOC Pedro Ramirez Vazquez and others.

In 1983, after Yuri Andropov, who had succeeded Brezhnev as party leader, Pavlov was dismissed, and appointed Ambassador to Mongolia, and later Ambassador to Burma. He was made to retire in 1989, aged 60, and died four years later.

References 

1929 births
1993 deaths
Communist Party of the Soviet Union members
People from Rzhev
People from Tver Governorate
Recipients of the Order of Lenin
Ambassadors of the Soviet Union to Mongolia
Ambassadors of the Soviet Union to Myanmar
Members of the Supreme Soviet of the Russian Soviet Federative Socialist Republic, 1959–1963
Sixth convocation members of the Supreme Soviet of the Soviet Union
Seventh convocation members of the Supreme Soviet of the Soviet Union
Central Committee of the Communist Party of the Soviet Union members
Burials at Kuntsevo Cemetery